Atympanum is a genus of grasshoppers in the subfamily Oedipodinae, from China.

Species
The Orthoptera Species File lists:
 Atympanum antennatum Yin, 1984
 Atympanum belonocercum (Liu, 1981)
 Atympanum carinotum (Yin, 1979) type species (as Oreoptygonotus carinotus Yin)
 Atympanum comainensis (Liu, 1981)
 Atympanum gonggarensis Zheng & Chen, 1995
 Atympanum nigrofasciatum Yin, 1984

References

Acrididae genera